Nairoby is a given name. Notable people with the name include:

 Nairoby Abigail Jiménez (born 2000), Dominican Republic badminton player
 Nairo (gamer), gamer tag of Nairoby Quezada (born 1996), American esports player

See also
Nairobi (disambiguation)